The 1940 season was Wisła Krakóws 32nd year as a club.

Friendlies

Okupacyjne Mistrzostwa Krakowa

Turniej Błyskawiczny

 All matches were played 2x15 minutes.

External links
1940 Wisła Kraków season at historiawisly.pl

Wisła Kraków seasons
Association football clubs 1940 season
Wisla